Eva is a genus of moth in the family Geometridae.

Species
Eva flexa Vojnits, 1981
Eva petulans Vojnits, 1981 (unavailable name)

References

External links
Natural History Museum Lepidoptera genus database

Eupitheciini